A pipelayer (or pipe-layer or drain layer) is a skilled tradesman who lays pipe, such as for storm sewers, sanitary sewers, drains, and water mains. Pipelayers may grade (i.e., level) trenches and culverts, position pipe, or seal joints. The Standard Occupational Classification System code for pipelayers is 47-2151.

The Bureau of Labor Statistics of the United States Department of Labor estimated that there were 41,080 pipelayers in the United States in May 2014, earning a median hourly wage of $17.38 and a median annual wage of $37,000. (The BLS definition of pipelayer excludes welders, cutters, solderers, and brazers). Pipelayers most commonly work in the utility system construction, building construction, and highway, street, and bridge construction sectors. Among U.S. states, Alabama and North Dakota have the highest concentration of pipelaying jobs.

Pipelayers should not be confused with pipefitters. Both trades involve pipe and valves and both use some of the same tools. However, pipelayers usually work outside, laying pipe underground or on the seabed, while pipefitters typically work inside, installing piping in buildings or ships. One author summarizes the different tasks this way:

See also
Pipe-laying ship

References

Construction trades workers
Industrial occupations